}}

The 1990 Wisconsin gubernatorial election was held on November 6, 1990. Incumbent Republican governor Tommy Thompson won the election with 58% of the vote, winning a second term as Governor of Wisconsin. 

As of 2022, this is the most recent Wisconsin gubernatorial election in which a Republican candidate won at the same time the party held the presidency. Neither party would pull off such a feat again until 2022, when Democratic governor Tony Evers won re-election during the presidency of fellow Democrat Joe Biden.

Results

References

1990
Wisconsin
1990 Wisconsin elections